Pipitea is a central suburb of Wellington, in the Wellington region of New Zealand's North Island.

Geography

The new suburb of Pipitea was created and its boundaries were fixed at a meeting of the full Wellington City Council on 20 August 2003. After that time suburb changes must receive the further consent of the New Zealand Geographic Board.
the territory
the sites of Pipitea Pā and Old St Paul's on the inland side of Thorndon Quay,
the reclaimed land east and south of Thorndon Quay and Hutt Road from along the shoreline from Kaiwharawhara to Whitmore Street,
the Government Centre bounded by Kate Sheppard Place (formerly Sydney Street East),  Hill Street, Sydney Street West, Bowen Street and the reclaimed land.

Demographics

Pipitea

It had a population of 465 at the 2018 New Zealand census, a decrease of 18 people (-3.7%) since the 2013 census, and an increase of 21 people (4.7%) since the 2006 census. There were 225 households. There were 240 males and 225 females, giving a sex ratio of 1.07 males per female, with 30 people (6.5%) aged under 15 years, 141 (30.3%) aged 15 to 29, 249 (53.5%) aged 30 to 64, and 42 (9.0%) aged 65 or older.

Ethnicities were 78.1% European/Pākehā, 9.0% Māori, 2.6% Pacific peoples, 16.8% Asian, and 2.6% other ethnicities (totals add to more than 100% since people could identify with multiple ethnicities).

Although some people objected to giving their religion, 52.3% had no religion, 32.9% were Christian, 5.2% were Hindu, 1.3% were Muslim, 1.9% were Buddhist and 3.2% had other religions.

Of those at least 15 years old, 210 (48.3%) people had a bachelor or higher degree, and 9 (2.1%) people had no formal qualifications. The employment status of those at least 15 was that 321 (73.8%) people were employed full-time, 39 (9.0%) were part-time, and 12 (2.8%) were unemployed.

Pipitea-Kaiwharawhara

Pipitea-Kaiwharawhara had a population of 960 at the 2018 New Zealand census, an increase of 111 people (13.1%) since the 2013 census, and an increase of 363 people (60.8%) since the 2006 census. There were 387 households. There were 474 males and 486 females, giving a sex ratio of 0.98 males per female. The median age was 32.5 years (compared with 37.4 years nationally), with 78 people (8.1%) aged under 15 years, 354 (36.9%) aged 15 to 29, 444 (46.2%) aged 30 to 64, and 81 (8.4%) aged 65 or older.

Ethnicities were 77.8% European/Pākehā, 10.0% Māori, 2.5% Pacific peoples, 17.2% Asian, and 4.1% other ethnicities (totals add to more than 100% since people could identify with multiple ethnicities).

The proportion of people born overseas was 34.4%, compared with 27.1% nationally.

Although some people objected to giving their religion, 54.7% had no religion, 30.3% were Christian, 5.0% were Hindu, 0.6% were Muslim, 0.9% were Buddhist and 3.1% had other religions.

Of those at least 15 years old, 390 (44.2%) people had a bachelor or higher degree, and 30 (3.4%) people had no formal qualifications. The median income was $52,400, compared with $31,800 nationally. The employment status of those at least 15 was that 558 (63.3%) people were employed full-time, 138 (15.6%) were part-time, and 39 (4.4%) were unemployed.

Economy

Retail

The Capital Gateway Centre shopping precinct has 13 stores, including Freedom Furniture.

References

Suburbs of Wellington City
Populated places around the Wellington Harbour